SS Argo was a Finnish Cargo ship that the Soviet submarine Shch-317 torpedoed on 16 June 1942 in the Gulf of Finland between Bogskär and Utö, Finland.

Construction 
Argo was built at the Napier R. & Sons shipyard in Glasgow, Scotland, United Kingdom in 1898. Where she was launched and completed that same year. The ship could reach a maximum speed of 8.5 knots and could generate 832 n.h.p.

Sinking 
Argo was torpedoed and sunk by the Soviet submarine Shch-317 torpedoed on 16 June 1942 in the Gulf of Finland between Bogskär and Utö, Finland. The sinking claimed the lives of 9 of her crew and the 14 survivors were rescued by the Swedish merchant ship Ulla, who herself was nearly torpedoed by the same Soviet submarine.

Wreck 

References

Cargo ships of Finland
1898 ships
Ships built in Glasgow
Steamships of Finland
Ships sunk by Soviet submarines
Shipwrecks in the Baltic Sea
Shipwrecks in the Gulf of Finland
World War II shipwrecks in the Baltic Sea
Steamships of the United Kingdom
Steamships of Sweden
Merchant ships of Sweden
Merchant ships of the United Kingdom
Maritime incidents in June 1942